The Bangladesh cricket team toured Zimbabwe in July 2021 to play one Test, three One Day International (ODI), and three Twenty20 International (T20I) matches. The ODI series formed part of the inaugural 2020–2023 ICC Cricket World Cup Super League. Bangladesh last toured Zimbabwe in April and May 2013. Originally, two Test matches were scheduled to be played on the tour, but one of them was removed in place of an extra T20I match.

Despite the suspension of sporting activity due to the COVID-19 pandemic, Zimbabwe's Sports and Recreation Commission (SRC) gave its permission for the tour to go ahead. In June 2021, the tour itinerary was confirmed by Zimbabwe Cricket, with all the matches being played in a bio-secure environment at the Harare Sports Club behind closed doors.

The Bangladesh cricket team arrived in Zimbabwe on 30 June 2021, following a twelve-team T20 tournament in Bangladesh. During the one-off Test match, Bangladesh's Mahmudullah announced his retirement from Test cricket. Bangladesh went on to win the Test match by 220 runs. Bangladesh won the first ODI by 155 runs, and the second match by three wickets, to win the series with a match to spare. Bangladesh won the third ODI by five wickets to win the series 3–0.

On 19 July 2021, both cricket boards agreed to a minor reschedule of the T20I fixtures. The end date of the tour was brought forward by two days, due to "scheduling and logistical challenges".

The first T20I match of the series was also the 100th T20I to be played by Bangladesh. With their eight-wicket victory, they became the third team, after Australia and Pakistan, to win their 100th match in all three formats of international cricket. Zimbabwe won the second T20I match by 23 runs to level the series with one match to play. Bangladesh won the third T20I match by five wickets to win the series 2–1.

Squads

Three days after the Bangladesh Cricket Board (BCB) had named the squads for the tour, Mahmudullah was added to Bangladesh's Test squad. Initially, Mahmudullah had not been included in the Test squad after not being able to bowl due to an injury. After initially opting out of the T20I matches, Bangladesh's Mushfiqur Rahim made himself available for the fixtures. However, he later pulled out of the ODI and T20I squads due to family reasons. Tamim Iqbal was ruled out of Bangladesh's T20I squad due to a knee injury.

Sean Williams was initially named as Zimbabwe's captain for the one-off Test. However, Williams and Craig Ervine both had to go into self-isolation, after being in close-contact with an individual who was COVID-19 positive. As a result, Brendan Taylor was named as Zimbabwe's captain for the match. Taylor was also named as captain of Zimbabwe's ODI team, with Williams and Ervine continuing to isolate. Brendan Taylor was rested for the T20I fixtures with Sikandar Raza named as Zimbabwe's captain for the matches.

Warm-up matches

Only Test

ODI series

1st ODI

2nd ODI

3rd ODI

T20I series

1st T20I

2nd T20I

3rd T20I

References

External links
 Series home at ESPN Cricinfo

2021 in Bangladeshi cricket
2021 in Zimbabwean cricket
International cricket competitions in 2021
Bangladeshi cricket tours of Zimbabwe